The 1924 Glasgow Kelvingrove by-election was held on 23 May 1924.  The by-election was held due to the death of the incumbent Conservative MP, William Hutchison.  It was won by the Conservative candidate Walter Elliot.

Background
Glasgow Kelvingrove had been held by candidates of the Unionist Party (as the Conservatives were then known in Scotland) since 1918. However at the 1923 general election the Unionist majority had been cut to just over 1,000 votes, by far the closest result in the seat up to that point. The Unionists selected Walter Elliot, who had lost his Lanark seat at the 1923 election, and had previously been Undersecretary of Health for Scotland in the last Conservative Government.

The Labour candidate was Aitken Ferguson who had stood as Labour candidate at the previous election. However Ferguson, who was a member of the Communist Party of Great Britain and was an official candidate of that party, was not official endorsed by the Labour Party in that contest. He was endorsed by the National Executive Committee of the Labour Party as its candidate for the by-election. However according to F. W. S. Craig the Labour Party's annual Conference Report for 1924 recorded that owing to "developments during the campaign it had been found impossible to render further support."

Result

References

1924 in Scotland
1920s elections in Scotland
1924 elections in the United Kingdom
Kelvingrove, 1924
1920s in Glasgow